Kanti Thermal Power Station also known as George Fernandes Thermal Power Plant Station  is located in Kanti, Muzaffarpur, Bihar. George Fernandes was former Member of Parliament from Muzaffarpur constituency of Bihar. It is wholly owned subsidiary company of NTPC. The  share of the company is 100% of the NTPC. The plant was not functional between 2003 and 2013; however, renovation of both older units paved the way for commercial production of electricity by the end of 2013.

In November 2013, Chief Minister Nitish Kumar said that another new 500 MW power plant will be set up at Kanti. The first 195 MW unit was commissioned by BHEL at the 2×195 MW plant in March 2015.

The second unit of the 2×195 MW was commissioned on 13 June 2016. Muzaffarpur Thermal Power Station has an installed capacity of 610 MW. Another 500 MW extension has been planned. East Central Railway will provide uninterrupted supply of coal to the thermal power station. The electrification work between Kaparpura and Kanti stations will be completed.

History
First started in 1985, Kanti Power Plant had an initial installed capacity of 110×2 MW. An additional capacity of 195×2 MW was erected in 2015-16. Kanti thermal Power Plant came into existence  with the efforts of then MP of Muzaffarpur, George Fernandes. The construction of the plant began during George's first tenure as MP of Muzaffarpur in 1978. In November 2014, Kanti plant was renamed as George Fernandes Thermal Power Plant to acknowledge his contribution.
To take over Muzaffarpur Thermal Power Station (2*110MW), a subsidiary company named Vaishali Power Generating Company Limited with NTPC on 06/09/2006,-contributing 51% of equity; and the balance equity was contributed by Bihar State Electricity Board. The company was rechristened as ‘Kanti Bijlee Utpadan Nigam Limited’ on April 10, 2008. Present equity holding is 100% by ntpc  and now it's not a joint venture but is a wholly owned subsidiary company of ntpc. The company renovated and modernized the existing unit.The total cost of its renovation and modernization has been over Rs. 500 crores.

In March 2013, the renovation work of two old units was completed. MTPS started commercial production from November 1, 2013 by supplying 94 MW. This is first generation in 11 years since 2002.  On 17 April 2018, Bihar state cabinet, headed by chief minister Nitish Kumar,  gave its nod to handing over of Kanti Thermal Power Station to National Thermal Power Corporation. On 15 May 2018, Bihar Government signed a memorandum of understanding (MoU) to hand over the thermal plant to National Thermal Power Corporation for a 33- years lease.

Capacity

See also

 Bihar State Power Holding Company Limited
 NTPC Limited
 Barauni Thermal Power Station
 Kahalgaon Super Thermal Power Station
 Barh Super Thermal Power Station

References

Coal-fired power stations in Bihar
Energy infrastructure completed in 1985
Muzaffarpur district
1985 establishments in Bihar